Jean-Pierre Stephane Drivet (2 April 1942 – 21 September 2004) was a French rower. He competed at the 1964 Summer Olympics and the 1968 Summer Olympics.

References

External links
 

1942 births
2004 deaths
French male rowers
Olympic rowers of France
Rowers at the 1964 Summer Olympics
Rowers at the 1968 Summer Olympics
World Rowing Championships medalists for France